Tursko Małe  is a village in the administrative district of Gmina Połaniec, within Staszów County, Świętokrzyskie Voivodeship, in south-central Poland.

The village has a population of  202.

Demography 
According to the 2002 Poland census, there were 205 people residing in Tursko Małe village, of whom 48.8% were male and 51.2% were female. In the village, the population was spread out, with 26.3% under the age of 18, 37.6% from 18 to 44, 16.6% from 45 to 64, and 19.5% who were 65 years of age or older.
 Figure 1. Population pyramid of village in 2002 — by age group and sex

Former parts of village — physiographic objects 
In the years 1970  last age, sorted and prepared out list part of names of localities for Tursko Małe, what you can see in table 3.

References

Villages in Staszów County